Ernest Hickinbottom (born 1865 - 2 September 1939) was an English footballer who played for Derby County.

He died at the Baseball Ground watching Derby playing Aston Villa on 2 September 1939.

References

1865 births
English footballers
Derby Midland F.C. players
Derby County F.C. players
English Football League players
1939 deaths
Association football midfielders
People from Darley Abbey
Footballers from Derby